Shunga is a type of Japanese erotic art.

Shunga may also refer to:
 Shunga Empire or Śuṅga Empire, an Indian empire of the 2nd and 1st century BCE
 Pushyamitra Shunga, the founder of the Shunga empire
 Shunga (Karelia), a village in Russia's Republic of Karelia

See also
 Sunga (disambiguation)
 Shungite, a mineraloid named after the village in Karelia.